Philippe Dubeau (born 14 July 1948) is a French classical organist and politician. He was mayor of the commune of Pageas in the Haute-Vienne department from 2001 until 2020.

As of late, he was titular of the grand organs of the Notre-Dame de Clignancourt church in Paris.

Selected discography 
 Trompette et Orgue - Telemann / Loeillet / Corelli / Albinoni - Pierre Thibaud, trumpet; organ of Notre-Dame-de-Clignancourt (June 1997, ILD) 
 Les plus beaux adagios (Bach, Haendel, Stradella, Corelli) - Renaud Fontanarosa, cello; organ of Notre-Dame-de-Clignancourt (1994, ILD) 
 Bach, les grandes œuvres pour orgue - organ of Saint-Augustin à Paris (1990, ILD) ,

References

External links 
 Discography

1947 births
Living people
French classical organists
French male organists
20th-century French musicians
21st-century French musicians
Chevaliers of the Ordre des Arts et des Lettres
21st-century organists
20th-century French male musicians
21st-century French male musicians
Male classical organists